Kupperberg is a surname. Notable people with the surname include:

Alan Kupperberg (1953–2015), American comics artist and writer
Paul Kupperberg (born 1955), American comics writer and editor, brother of Alan

See also
Kupferberg (disambiguation)